McCulley Township may refer to one of the following places within the United States:

 McCulley Township, Boyd County, Nebraska
 McCulley Township, Emmons County, North Dakota

Township name disambiguation pages